Typhlobolellidae is a family of millipedes belonging to the order Spirobolida.

Genera:
 Ergene Chamberlin, 1943
 Morelene Chamberlin, 1943
 Reddellobus Causey, 1975
 Typhlobolellus Hoffman, 1969

References

Spirobolida